Patrick Finucane (5 December 1890 – 10 April 1984) was an Irish Clann na Talmhan politician who served as a Teachta Dála (TD) for the Kerry North constituency from 1943 to 1969.

He was elected as a member of Clann na Talmhan TD for the Kerry North constituency at the 1943 general election, he was re-elected at the 1944 and 1948 general elections. He was elected as an independent TD at the 1951 general election, he returned to Clann na Talmhan at the 1954 general election, but sat again as an independent from the 1957 general election until his retirement at the 1969 general election.

References

1890 births
1984 deaths
Independent TDs
Clann na Talmhan TDs
Members of the 11th Dáil
Members of the 12th Dáil
Members of the 13th Dáil
Members of the 14th Dáil
Members of the 15th Dáil
Members of the 16th Dáil
Members of the 17th Dáil
Members of the 18th Dáil
Irish farmers